Paulo Lucas Santos de Paula (born 8 January 1997), better known as Paulinho, is a Brazilian professional footballer who plays as a midfielder for Al-Fayha on loan from Al-Shabab in the Saudi Professional League.

Professional career
Paulinho made his debut with Sporting B in a 4-0 LigaPro win over C.D. Santa Clara on 30 September 2017. On 19 July 2019, Paulinho signed a professional contract with Boavista. 

On 28 July 2021, Paulinho joined Saudi Arabian club Al-Shabab on a four-year deal. On 30 July 2022, Paulinho joined Al-Fayha on a season-long loan.

References

External links
 Paulinho :: Paulo Lucas Santos de Paula at ZeroZero.pt

1997 births
Living people
Footballers from Rio de Janeiro (city)
Brazilian footballers
Boavista F.C. players
Sporting CP B players
Al-Shabab FC (Riyadh) players
Al-Fayha FC players
Primeira Liga players
Liga Portugal 2 players
Saudi Professional League players
Association football midfielders
Brazilian expatriate footballers
Expatriate footballers in Portugal
Expatriate footballers in Saudi Arabia
Brazilian expatriate sportspeople in Portugal
Brazilian expatriate sportspeople in Saudi Arabia